William Newman may refer to:

 William Newman (woodcarver) (born c. 1649, flourished 1670–1694), English woodcarver
 William Newman (MP) for Poole (UK Parliament constituency)
 William Newman (computer scientist) (1939–2019), British computer scientist
 William Newman (priest) (1811–1864), inaugural Anglican Dean of Cape Town
 William Newman (actor) (1934–2015), American actor
 William Newman (Canadian politician) (1873–?), politician from Ontario, Canada
 William Gould Newman, politician from Ontario, Canada; MPP, 1967–1981
 William Newman (American football) (c. 1882 – 1964), American college football player and coach
 William A. Newman (born 1948), American painter and computer artist
 William P. Newman (1810–1866), fugitive slave
 William R. Newman (born 1955), American historian of science
 William S. Newman (1912–2000), American musicologist
 William Truslow Newman (1843–1920), U.S. federal judge
 William Clifford Newman (1928–2017), American clergyman of the Roman Catholic Church
 Billy Newman (born 1947), Irish footballer
 William Alexander Newman, better known as Sandy Newman, member of Marmalade (band)

See also
 William Neuman
 William Neumann
 Newman (surname)